Walter H. Hunt (September 5, 1868 – May 4, 1942) was a member of the Wisconsin State Senate.

Biography
Hunt was born on September 5, 1868, in Kingston, Wisconsin. He graduated from Valparaiso University. Later, he enlisted in the United States Army. He died in River Falls, Wisconsin in 1942.

Political career
Hunt was elected to the Senate in 1924 as a Republican. In 1934, he was a candidate in the Wisconsin Progressive Party primary for the United States House of Representatives from Wisconsin's 9th congressional district, losing to Merlin Hull.

References

External links

People from Kingston, Wisconsin
Republican Party Wisconsin state senators
Wisconsin Progressives (1924)
20th-century American politicians
Military personnel from Wisconsin
United States Army soldiers
Valparaiso University alumni
1868 births
1942 deaths